The Flash (DC Rebirth) is an American superhero comic book written by Joshua Williamson (of Nailbiter and  Birthright fame) and published twice-monthly by DC Comics. The title follows the adventure of Barry Allen as the superhero Flash in Central City. The title is part of DC's Rebirth relaunch, following the end of The New 52 initiative established following the Flashpoint storyline in 2011, and started publication in August 2016.

Story arcs

Lightning Strikes Twice (2016)
While investigating a crime scene, Barry Allen has visions of Wally West, Eobard Thawne and an individual in white clothes. While running through Central City, Barry encounters Wally, who had been absorbed into the Speed Force and attempts to warn Barry about the involvement of someone in the timeline. Just as Wally is about to be absorbed forever into the Speed Force, Barry remembers him and pulls him out. Reuniting, Wally also warns Barry that they "are being watched". After discussing what to do next, Barry goes to visit Batman to talk about the button they found.

While at a crime scene, Barry reunites with his old friend August Heart, who was present on the day he was struck by lightning and gained his powers. Soon, citizens all over Central City gain the powers of The Speed Force seemingly at random.

Speed of Darkness (2016–2017)
As Barry neglects to train the new Kid Flash (Who coincidentally is also named Wally West), he decides to take matters into his own hands and battle Shade (comics).

Rogues Reloaded (2017)
After the supervillain team The Rogues has mysteriously disappeared, Flash goes looking for them. The Rogues enact deadly traps to kill Flash once and for all.

The Button (2017)

Running Scared (2017)
Eobard Thawne (aka the Reverse Flash) returns once again to ruin Barry's life and threatens to strike down everyone close to him.

Negative (2017)
Barry's new powers aren’t working properly as he faces a new villain, Bloodwork, who has secret ties to Barry Allen.

Cold Day in Hell (2017–2018)

Perfect Storm (2018)

Flash War (2018)

Reckoning of the Forces (2018–2019)

Force Quest (2019)

The Greatest Trick of All (2019)

Year One (2019)

Death and The Speed Force (2019)

Rogues Reign (2020)

The Flash Age (2021)

Finish Line (2021)

Production

Background
In 2011, DC Comics published the Flashpoint story arc in which Barry Allen travelled back in time in order to prevent his mother's murder. While doing so, he ended up altering the universe, creating one in which Wonder Woman and Aquaman are at war with one another and have decimated Western Europe, among other changes. Following its conclusion, the series radically changed the status quo of the DC Universe, leading to The New 52. DC cancelled all of their titles and debuted 52 new series in September 2011 with new first issues. One of the new 52 series starting in September was the fourth volume of The Flash, starring Barry Allen.

In February 2015, it was announced that following the Convergence storyline in May, DC would be ending its New 52 branding, though the continuity established post-Flashpoint would continue. In February 2016, DC announced another line-wide relaunch of their titles called DC Rebirth. Rebirth was an attempt to restore the DC Universe to a form similar to the one before Flashpoint, while still incorporating elements of The New 52, including its continuity. Due to the relaunch, the New 52 Flash volume ended with #52 in May 2016.

Development and writing
As part of the DC Rebirth imprint relaunch, The Flash was first announced in March 2016, with Joshua Willaimson writing the title. A The Flash: Rebirth one-shot was published in June, with the series starting the same month.

Williamson revealed during a Rebirth livestream that he first approached Dan DiDio about wanting to write The Flash in Summer 2015, telling DiDio that writing The Flash is "really important to [him, and] that there's a story that [he] really [has] to tell". He also revealed that during the first story arc, a Speed Force storm would hit Central City. The storm would strike numerous people and give them super speed, with Barry having to train them. Among the characters to receive powers, Williamson also revealed a new speedster named Godspeed who would act as the main antagonist during the first story arc. To differentiate Godspeed from previous evil speedsters like Eobard Thawne, Williamson made the character more sympathetic and calculating. An element of Barry's character that Williamson wanted to highlight in the title, was his passion for "doing the right thing". During the first arc, the evolution of Wallace West into Kid Flash is also explored.

According to Williamson, neither DiDio nor Geoff Johns mandated any of the Rebirth titles to resemble their film or TV adaptations. During early meeting, Williamson suggest the inclusion of character similar to Harrison Wells from the TV series to be in the comic; the idea was shut down due to not wanting to make the comic similar to the show.

Williamson stated that the Rogues are some of his favorite Flash villains and planned to use them following the conclusion of the first story arc.

Publication history

Reception

Critical response

Commercial performance

Collected editions
{| class="wikitable sortable" 
|-
!  class="unsortable" | # !! Title !! Material collected !! class="unsortable" |  Pages !! |Publication Date !! class="unsortable" | ISBN
|-
! colspan="6" |Paperback
|-
|1
|Lightning Strikes Twice
|The Flash: Rebirth #1, The Flash vol. 5 #1–8
|216
|
| align="right" |
|-
|2
|Speed of Darkness
|The Flash vol. 5 #9–13
|128
|
| align="right" |
|-
|3
|Rogues Reloaded
|The Flash vol. 5 #14–20
|168
|
| align="right" |
|-
|4
|Running Scared
|The Flash vol. 5 #23–27
|136
|
| align="right" |
|-
|5
|Negative
|The Flash vol. 5 #28–32
|128
|
| align="right" |
|-
|6
|Cold Day in Hell
|The Flash vol. 5 #34–38, Annual #1
|128
|
| align="right" |
|-
|7
|Perfect Storm
|The Flash vol. 5 #39–45
|184
|
| align="right" |
|-
|8
|Flash War
|The Flash vol. 5 #46–51, a story from Annual #1
|160
|
| align="right" |
|-
|9
|Reckoning of the Forces
| The Flash vol. 5 #52–57
|160
|
| align="right" |
|-
|10
|Force Quest 
|The Flash vol. 5 #58–63
|144
|September 24, 2019
| align="right" |
|-
|11
|The Greatest Trick of All 
|The Flash vol. 5 #66–69, Annual #2
|144
|February 11, 2020
| align="right" |
|-
|
|Year One
|The Flash vol. 5 #70–75
|168
|November 19, 2019
| align="right" |
|-
|12
|Death and the Speed Force
|The Flash vol. 5 #76–81
|144 
|June 9, 2020
| align="right" |
|-
|13
|Rogues Reign
|The Flash vol. 5 #82–87
|152 
|November 17, 2020
| align="right" |
|-
|14
|The Flash Age
|The Flash vol. 5 #88, #750–755, Annual #3
|216 
|May 11, 2021
| align="right" |
|-
|15
|Finish Line
|The Flash #756–762
|168 
|October 12, 2021
| align="right" |
|-
! colspan="6" |Deluxe Hardcovers
|-
| colspan="2" |Batman/The Flash: The Button
|The Flash vol. 5 #21–22, Batman vol. 3 #21–22
|104
|
| align="right" |
|-
| colspan="2" |Heroes In Crisis: The Price and Other Stories
|The Flash vol. 5 #64–65, Annual #2, Batman vol. 3 #64–65, Green Arrow vol. 6 #45, 48–50
|248
|
| align="right" |
|-
| colspan="2" |The Rebirth Deluxe Edition Book 1
|The Flash: Rebirth #1, #1–13
|336
|
| align="right" |
|-
| colspan="2" |The Rebirth Deluxe Edition Book 2
|The Flash vol. 5 #14–27
|244
|
| align="right" |
|-
| colspan="2" |The Rebirth Deluxe Edition Book 3
|The Flash vol. 5 #28–38, Annual #1, DC Universe Holiday Special #1
|264
|
| align="right" |
|-
| colspan="2" |The Rebirth Deluxe Edition Book 4
|The Flash vol. 5 #28–38
|352
|Canceled
| align="right" |
|-
|}

References

2016 comics debuts
DC Comics titles
Flash (comics)
Superhero comics